Bethlehem is an extinct town in Marion County, in the U.S. state of Ohio. The community was 3 miles northwest of Waldo.

History
Bethlehem had its start around 1860 as a small colony of German and Irish Catholics.

References

Ghost towns in Ohio
Landforms of Marion County, Ohio